Jaime Aguilar Álvarez y Mazarrasa (born 4 August 1938) was a Mexican politician from the Institutional Revolutionary Party. He had served as the Deputy of the L, LIII and LXI Legislatures of the Mexican Congress representing Tlaxcala.

References

1938 births
2019 deaths
People from Tlaxcala
Members of the Chamber of Deputies (Mexico) for Tlaxcala
Institutional Revolutionary Party politicians
21st-century Mexican politicians
20th-century Mexican politicians
Members of the Congress of Mexico City
Deputies of the L Legislature of Mexico
Deputies of the LIII Legislature of Mexico
Deputies of the LXI Legislature of Mexico